Philip Brian Cecil Moore, Baron Moore of Wolvercote,  (6 April 1921 – 7 April 2009) was Private Secretary to Queen Elizabeth II of the United Kingdom from 1977 to 1986.

He was educated at the Dragon School, Cheltenham College, then Brasenose College, Oxford, and served in RAF Bomber Command during World War II. He played one match for the  international rugby union team, against  in the 1951 Five Nations Championship.

Moore was then Private Secretary from 1957 to 1958, to the 10th Earl of Selkirk in the latter's capacity as First Lord of the Admiralty. He was Deputy British High Commissioner (and acting HC) in Singapore, 1963–65, and back in the UK, Chief of Public Relations of the Ministry of Defence 1965–66. He was then Assistant Private Secretary to Queen Elizabeth II from 1966 to 1972, then as Deputy until 1977 and as Private Secretary to the Sovereign until 1986. On his retirement in 1986, he was created Baron Moore of Wolvercote, of Wolvercote in the City of Oxford and he lived in a grace and favour apartment in Hampton Court Palace. He received the honour of being made a Permanent Lord in Waiting. He received the Queen Elizabeth II Version of the Royal Household Long and Faithful Service Medal for 20 years of service to the Royal Family in 1986.   
His former son-in-law is the singer Peter Gabriel. His wife Joanna died in 2011 aged 86.

References

External links
 

1921 births
2009 deaths
Alumni of Brasenose College, Oxford
Assistant Private Secretaries to the Sovereign
Moore of Wolvercote, Philip Moore, Baron
Moore of Wolvercote, Philip Moore, Baron
Moore of Wolvercote
Deputy Private Secretaries to the Sovereign
Moore of Wolvercote, Philip Moore, Baron
Moore of Wolvercote, Philip Moore, Baron
Members of the Privy Council of the United Kingdom
People educated at Cheltenham College
Private Secretaries to the Sovereign
Royal Air Force personnel of World War II
England international rugby union players
Sportspeople from Gloucestershire
English cricketers
Oxfordshire cricketers
Oxford University RFC players
Life peers created by Elizabeth II